East Forsyth High School may refer to:

 East Forsyth High School (Georgia)
 East Forsyth High School (North Carolina)